Sverri Patursson (1871–1960) was a Faroese writer, author, and journalist. He was also a translator, ornithologist and environmentalist.

Patursson was born in the village of  Kirkjubøur on Streymoy, Faroe Islands. He attended  Vallekilde Folk High School  in Zealand in Denmark. Patursson worked as a journalist and his articles frequently featured Faroese wildlife with birds a principal focus. He was devoted to make the Faroe Islands known, and his actions included writing tourist articles as a freelance journalist for the Scandinavian press. Patursson was also a translator and literary writer, and an early author who wrote in Faroese. Patursson was the brother of Súsanna Helena Patursson, a famous Faroese actress and writer in her own right, and Jóannes Patursson, who led the Faroese nationalist movement.

Bibliography

Own work 
 Dagdvølja, 1901
 Nøkur orð um hin føroyska dansin, 1908
 Fra Færøernes næringsveie i tekst og billeder, Kria. 1918
 Móti loysing (political articles), 1925
 Landaskipan og figgjarlig viðurskiftur i fristatinum Føroyar (political articles), 1928
 Fuglar og folk (noveller og essays), 1935 (2nd edition 1968)
 Fuglar og fólk. Kirkjubøur: Øssur Patursson, 1968 (176 pages)
 Fram við Sugguni : søgur, greinir, røður og yrkingar. (short stories, articles, speeches and poems, published after his death). Tórshavn: Emil Thomsen, 1971 (172 pages)
 Fuglaframi: 1898-1902. Tórshavn: Offset-prent, Emil Thomsen, 1972 (408 pages)
 Fra Færøernes næringsveie i tekst og billeder : med historisk oversigt. Tórshavn: Sjóvinnubankin, 1982 (76 pages)
 Ábal og aðrar søgur Tórshavn: Føroya skúlabókagrunnur, (Ábal and other short stories) 2nd edition 2004 (45 pages, school book)

Translations 
 Robinson Kruso - Daniel Defoe (translated into Faroese by Sverre Patursson), 1914 (2nd edition 1968)

References

External links 

1871 births
1960 deaths
Faroese writers
Faroese male poets
Danish ornithologists
20th-century Danish journalists
19th-century Faroese people
People from Kirkjubøur